Haymaking is the process of hay production and harvest.

Haymaking may also refer to:
The Hay Harvest (also known as Haymaking), a 1565 oil on wood painting by Peter Bruegel
Haymaking, an 1860 painting by Peter Paul Marshall
Haymaking, an 1877 painting by Jules Bastien-Lepage
Haymaking, a painting by Henry George Hine
Haymaking, a 1964 painting by Sergei Ivanovich Osipov
"Haymaking", a poem by Russian poet Apollon Maykov
"Haymaking", a poem by English poet John Clare
"Haymaking", an episode of the television series Teletubbies
Haymaking, the 1966 winner of the Nassau Stakes, Coronation Stakes, and Select Stakes
"Haymaking", a song by the Russian band Lubeh